Raninoida is a taxonomic section of the crabs, containing a single superfamily, Raninoidea. This group of crabs is unlike most, with the abdomen not being folded under the thorax. It comprises 46 extant species, and nearly 200 species known only from fossils.

Below is a cladogram showing Raninoidea's placement within Brachyura:

References

Crabs
Taxa named by Wilhem de Haan